Psychotoxicity is a pharmacology is the effect when a drug interferes seriously with normal behaviour.

References

Drug safety